Kateryna Mikhalitsyna (born February 23, 1982) is a Ukrainian poet, children's writer, translator and editor.

Early life and education 
Kateryna Mikhalitsyna was born on February 23, 1982, in Mlyniv. In 2003, she completed undergraduate studies in biology in Rivne. Six years later she graduated in English studies from the Ivan Franko National University of Lviv. She took on various jobs, then in 2008–2012 worked as an editor and translator at the Astroliabia Publishing House. In 2013 she took on the role of the deputy editor-in-chief of the Old Lion Publishing House, Mariana Savka. In 2014–2015 she took part in Lithuanian-Ukrainian translation studies.

Career 
Mikhalitsyna has published three poetry collections and a number of children's books. As a writer, editor and a translator she took part in various literary projects and events, such as the all-Ukrainian Add Reading! Initiative, Bologna Children's Literature Exhibition, Publishers’ Forum, and was a beneficiary of the Frankfurt Fellowship Programme at the Frankfurt Book Fair. Her poems have been translated into Bulgarian, Polish, German, Lithuanian, Russian, Swedish, Armenian and Greek. Her children's books Who grows in the park and Reactors do not explode. A short history of the Chernobyl disaster (written together with Stanislav Dvornytskiy) were included in the White Ravens catalogues of 2016 and 2021, respectively.

Mikhalitsyna has translated from English and Polish, including works by J. R. R. Tolkien, Oscar Wilde, Sylvia Plath and Alfred Szklarski. She is a member of PEN Ukraine.

She lives in Lviv.

Publications

Poetry 

 The Flood, 2000
 Pilgrim (self-published), 2002
 Shadow in the Mirror, 2013; ill.: Aliena Semchyshyn

Children's literature 

 Rainbow Over the Meadow, 2012, ill.: Yulia Polishchuk
 Grandma’s Abode, 2013, ill.: Natalka Haida
 Meadow Rhyme, 2015, ill.: Mariana Petriv
 Who Grows in the Park, 2016, ill.: Oksana Bula
 About Dragons and Happiness, 2016, ill.: Natalka Haida
 Who Grows in the Garden, 2017, ill.: Oksana Bula
 Yas and his Cars, 2018, ill.: Tetiana Tsiupka
 Yas and His Great Bikecareer, 2019, ill.: Tetiana Tsiupka
 Dmukhavka and Other Furry Little Poems, 2019, ill.: Yulia Pylypchatyna
 Tomo and his Whale, 2019, ill.: Oksana Drachkovska
 Reactors do not explode. A short history of the Chernobyl disaster, 2020, co-author: Stanislav Dvornytskiy

References 

Ukrainian children's writers
Ukrainian translators
Ukrainian women poets
21st-century Ukrainian women writers
Translators of Oscar Wilde
Translators from Polish
1982 births
Living people